The Muscatatuck River is a  river in south-central Indiana, United States.  It is a major tributary of the East Fork of the White River, and drains . In one area it serves as the southern boundary of the main unit of the Muscatatuck National Wildlife Refuge.  It also goes across the Crosley Fish and Wildlife Area and by Muscatatuck County Park.

Below the mouth of the Vernon Fork, the Muscatatuck measures approximately 585 cubic feet per second. This figure is arrived at by combining the approximate discharge of the Muscatatuck at Deputy, Indiana & the approximate discharge of the Vernon Fork Muscatatuck River at Vernon, Indiana.

The path of the Muscatatuck was formed by valley beds created during an ice age.  It is believed that the first people arrived and lived by the Muscatatuck around 8000 BC, maintaining permanent structures between 1000 BC to 1000 AD. The first documented whites arrived in 1818, although it is possible that squatters lived in the area before Indiana's 1816 statehood.

In the early 20th century, the name of the river was "Muscackituck". It is believed that the original white name was "Muscakituck", written in 1812 by a man named Tipton.  Some believe the name comes from the Munsee words for "swamp" and "river".

The  Vernon Fork of the Muscatatuck is a longer branch of the river than the main stem, or southern branch, of the Muscatatuck. The town of Vernon is nearly surrounded by the Vernon Fork, with only a small neck of dry land that leads to North Vernon.

Before 1830, the Muscatatuck River was navigable, with local settlers being able to ship pork down the river to eventually reach New Orleans. However, around 1830, the river became no longer navigable, as dirt fill accumulated along the river bed. However, some groups "float" along stretches of the river.  The Cavanaugh Bridge crosses the river southwest of Brownstown, Driftwood Township, Jackson County, Indiana.  It was listed on the National Register of Historic Places in 2007.

Noted Hoosier artist T. C. Steele particularly loved using the Muscatatuck River in his paintings.

See also
List of rivers of Indiana

References

Bodies of water of Jennings County, Indiana
Rivers of Indiana
Tributaries of the Wabash River